Muhammad Azri Suhaili Bin Muhammad Azar (born 12 July 2002) is a Singaporean footballer currently playing as a midfielder for Geylang International.

Career statistics

Club

Notes

References

External links

 Azri Suhaili Interview
 Geylang midfielder Azri Suhaili, 16, is third youngest to play in SPL

2002 births
Living people
Singaporean footballers
Association football midfielders
Singapore Premier League players
Geylang International FC players